Selective laser sintering (SLS) is an additive manufacturing (AM) technique that uses a laser as the power and heat source to sinter powdered material (typically nylon or polyamide), aiming the laser automatically at points in space defined by a 3D model, binding the material together to create a solid structure. It is similar to selective laser melting; the two are instantiations of the same concept but differ in technical details.  SLS (as well as the other mentioned AM techniques) is a relatively new technology that so far has mainly been used for rapid prototyping and for low-volume production of component parts. Production roles are expanding as the commercialization of AM technology improves.

History
Selective laser sintering (SLS) was developed and patented by Dr. Carl Deckard and academic adviser, Dr. Joe Beaman at the University of Texas at Austin in the mid-1980s, under sponsorship of DARPA. Deckard and Beaman were involved in the resulting start up company DTM, established to design and build the SLS machines. In 2001, 3D Systems, the biggest competitor to DTM and SLS technology, acquired DTM. The most recent patent regarding Deckard's SLS technology was issued January 28, 1997 and expired January 28, 2014.

A similar process was patented without being commercialized by R. F. Housholder in 1979.

As SLS requires the use of high-powered lasers it is often too expensive, not to mention possibly too dangerous, to use in the home. The associated expense and potential danger of SLS printing due to lack of commercially available laser systems with Class-1 safety enclosures means that the home market for SLS printing is not as large as the market for other additive manufacturing technologies, such as Fused Deposition Modeling (FDM).

Technology
An additive manufacturing layer technology, SLS involves the use of a high power laser (for example, a carbon dioxide laser) to fuse small particles of plastic, metal, ceramic, or glass powders into a mass that has a desired three-dimensional shape. The laser selectively fuses powdered material by scanning cross-sections generated from a 3-D digital description of the part (for example from a CAD file or scan data) on the surface of a powder bed. After each cross-section is scanned, the powder bed is lowered by one layer thickness, a new layer of material is applied on top, and the process is repeated until the part is completed.

Because finished part density depends on peak laser power, rather than laser duration, a SLS machine typically uses a pulsed laser. The SLS machine preheats the bulk powder material in the powder bed somewhat below its melting point, to make it easier for the laser to raise the temperature of the selected regions the rest of the way to the melting point.

In contrast with SLA and FDM, which most often require special support structures to fabricate overhanging designs, SLS does not need a separate feeder for support material because the part being constructed is surrounded by unsintered powder at all times. This allows for the construction of previously impossible geometries. Also, since the machine's chamber is always filled with powder material the fabrication of multiple parts has a far lower impact on the overall difficulty and price of the design because through a technique known as 'Nesting', where multiple parts can be positioned to fit within the boundaries of the machine. One design aspect which should be observed however is that with SLS it is 'impossible' to fabricate a hollow but fully enclosed element. This is because the unsintered powder within the element could not be drained.

Since patents have started to expire, affordable home printers have become possible, but the heating process is still an obstacle, with a power consumption of up to 5 kW and temperatures having to be controlled within 2 °C for the three stages of preheating, melting and storing before removal.

Materials 
The quality of printed structures depends on the various factors include powder properties such as particle size and shape, density, roughness, and porosity. Furthermore, the particle distribution and their thermal properties affect a lot on the flowability of the powder.

Commercially-available materials used in SLS come in powder form and include, but are not limited to, polymers such as polyamides (PA), polystyrenes (PS), thermoplastic elastomers (TPE), and polyaryletherketones (PAEK). Polyamides are the most commonly used SLS materials due to their ideal sintering behavior as a semi-crystalline thermoplastic, resulting in parts with desirable mechanical properties. Polycarbonate (PC) is a material of high interest for SLS due to its high toughness, thermal stability, and flame resistance; however, such amorphous polymers processed by SLS tend to result in parts with diminished mechanical properties, dimensional accuracy and thus are limited to applications where these are of low importance. Metal materials are not commonly used in SLS since the development of selective laser melting.

Powder Production 
Powder particles are typically produced by cryogenic grinding in a ball mill at temperatures well below the glass transition temperature of the material, which can be reached by running the grinding process with added cryogenic materials such as dry ice (dry grinding), or mixtures of liquid nitrogen and organic solvents (wet grinding). The process can result in spherical or irregular shaped particles as low as five microns in diameter. Powder particle size distributions are typically gaussian and range from 15 to 100 microns in diameter, although this can be customized to suit different layer thicknesses in the SLS process. Chemical binder coatings can be applied to the powder surfaces post-process; these coatings aid in the sintering process and are especially helpful to form composite material parts such as with alumina particles coated with thermoset epoxy resin.

Sintering mechanisms 

Sintering in SLS primarily occurs in the liquid state when the powder particles forms a micro-melt layer at the surface, resulting in a reduction in viscosity and the formation of a concave radial bridge between particles, known as necking, due to the material's response to lower its surface energy. In the case of coated powders, the purpose of the laser is to melt the surface coating which will act as a binder. Solid state sintering is also a contributing factor, albeit with a much reduced influence, and occurs at temperatures below the melting temperature of the material. The principal driving force behind the process is again the material's response to lower its free energy state resulting in diffusion of molecules across particles.

Applications 
SLS technology is in wide use at many industries around the world due to its ability to easily make complex geometries with little to no added manufacturing effort. Its most common application is in prototype parts early in the design cycle such as for investment casting patterns, automotive hardware, and wind tunnel models. SLS is also increasingly being used in limited-run manufacturing to produce end-use parts for aerospace, military, medical, pharmaceutical, and electronics hardware. On a shop floor, SLS can be used for rapid manufacturing of tooling, jigs, and fixtures. Because the process requires the use of a laser and other expensive, bulky equipment, it is not suited for personal or residential use; however, it has found applications in art [EOS artist citation with images].

Advantages 

 The sintered powder bed is fully self-supporting, allowing for:
 high overhanging angles (0 to 45 degrees from the horizontal plane) 
 complex geometries embedded deep into parts, such as conformal cooling channels
 batch production of multiple parts produced in 3D arrays, a process called nesting
 Parts possess high strength and stiffness
 Good chemical resistance
 Various finishing possibilities (e.g., metallization, stove enameling, vibratory grinding, tub coloring, bonding, powder, coating, flocking)
 Bio compatible according to EN ISO 10993-1 and USP/level VI/121 °C
 Complex parts with interior components can be built without trapping the material inside and altering the surface from support removal.
 Fastest additive manufacturing process for printing functional, durable, prototypes or end user parts
 Wide variety of materials with characteristics of strength, durability, and functionality
 Due to the reliable mechanical properties, parts can often substitute typical injection molding plastics

Disadvantages 

 parts have porous surfaces; these can be sealed by several different post-processing methods such as cyanoacrylate coatings, or by hot isostatic pressing.

See also
 3D printing
 Desktop manufacturing
 Digital fabricator
 Direct digital manufacturing
 Fab lab
 Fused deposition modeling (FDM)
 Instant manufacturing, also known as direct manufacturing or on-demand manufacturing
 Rapid manufacturing
 Rapid prototyping
 RepRap Project
 Solid freeform fabrication
 Stereolithography (SLA)
 Von Neumann universal constructor

References

External links
 DMLS – DEVELOPMENT HISTORY AND STATE OF THE ART
 Selective Laser Sintering, Birth of an Industry
 Laser sintering, melting and others – SLS, SLM, DMLS, DMP, EBM, SHS

American inventions
3D printing processes
Laser applications
Metalworking